Jin Cheng ((born 6 March 1998) is a Chinese amateur golfer.

In September 2014, Jin became the first amateur to lead a PGA Tour China event. In November 2014, he won the Nine Dragons Open on PGA Tour China, becoming the first amateur to win on that tour. He birdied the 17th hole Sunday at Nine Dragons Golf Club while leader, Brazil's Lucas Lee, made three bogeys over his final three holes.

Jin's victory in the 2014 Volvo China Junior Match Play Championship earned him entry into the Volvo China Open, a European Tour event.

Jin has also played, and made cuts on, the OneAsia Tour and the Asian Tour. In December 2015, Jin tied for 11th at the Asian Tour's Thailand Golf Championship for his best career finish outside of China.

In his PGA Tour China career, through the 2015 season, Jin has played 18 events, making the cut 13 times and recording six top-10s, including the victory.

Jin entered the U.S. Junior Amateur in Bluffton, South Carolina as the top-ranked player in the field, but he lost in the first round of match play to Norway's Kristoffer Reitan.

In November 2015, the USC Trojans announced that Jin had signed a national letter of intent to play collegiate golf there, beginning in 2016.

Jin won the rain-shortened 2015 Asia-Pacific Amateur Championship at Hong Kong's Clearwater Bay Golf & Country Club to earn entry into the 2016 Masters Tournament. In this tournament, he shot a course record 62 in the first round.

Amateur wins
2011 HSBC National Junior Championship Final
2012 Jack Nicklaus Junior Championship, China Amateur Futures Tour (Leg 3), Genesis Junior Championship
2013 National Team Selection (Leg 3), Ravenwood Junior Championship, NSRCC Junior Open, SGA 5th National Ranking Game
2014 Volvo China Junior Match Play
2015 Asia-Pacific Amateur Championship
2016 Players Amateur
2017 National Sports Games of China, Golf

Source:

Professional wins (1)

PGA Tour China wins (1)

Results in major championships

CUT = missed the halfway cut

Team appearances
Amateur
Bonallack Trophy (representing Asia/Pacific): 2014

References

External links

PGA Tour China profile

Chinese male golfers
Amateur golfers
Sportspeople from Beijing
Golfers at the 2018 Asian Games
Medalists at the 2018 Asian Games
Asian Games silver medalists for China
Asian Games bronze medalists for China
Asian Games medalists in golf
1998 births
Living people
21st-century Chinese people
20th-century Chinese people